Citrana is a small town in the East Timor exclave of Oecusse Special Administrative Region. It is located in the far west of the exclave, close to the mouth of the Noel Besi River, which forms part of the border with Indonesia.

References
Wheeler, T. (2004) East Timor. Footscray, VIC: Lonely Planet.

Populated places in Oecusse